Pleione is a small genus of predominantly terrestrial but sometimes epiphytic or lithophytic, miniature orchids. This genus is named after Pleione, mother of the Pleiades (in Greek mythology), and comprises about 20 species. Common names of this genus include peacock orchid, glory of the east, Himalayan crocus, Indian crocus and windowsill orchid. The genus Diploconchium Schauer is generally included here. Pleione is abbreviated to Pln in trade journals.

Name
Pleione is named after the water-nymph Pleione of Greek mythology.

Growth 

The sympodial growth habit of terrestrial Pleione orchids is unusual. They have relatively large, spongy, almost globular or ampulliform pseudobulbs, narrowed at the apex. These drop off before winter. The pseudobulb stays dormant, till a new one starts to develop. This one produces new roots and a short pedicel. This pseudobulb remains active till the end of the bloom. Then the whole cycle starts all over again.

The big, showy flowers originate from new shoots formed at the base of the pseudobulb. They are pink to purplish, white or yellow, while the fringed, tubular lip is often paler or white, with yellow, red or purple dots and stripes. The flowers of the mountain species start blooming in spring, while the new shoots develop. The flowers of the orchids, growing in warmer climates, bloom in autumn, when the leaves have dropped.

They are very closely related to the genus Coelogyne and were once considered part of it.

Distribution and habitat 
Pleione is distributed in the mountains and foothills of the Himalayas, India, Tibet, Nepal, Bhutan, Bangladesh, Myanmar, Thailand, Laos, Vietnam, Taiwan, and China. The species are well adapted to cold temperatures and even frost. A few, however, prefer warmer temperatures.

Species 
Pleione albiflora (China – W. Yunnan to N. Burma).
Pleione aurita (China – W. Yunnan).
Pleione autumnalis
Pleione arunachalensis
Pleione bulbocodioides (C. China to SE. Tibet).
Pleione chunii (S. China).
Pleione coronaria (C. Nepal).
Pleione dilamellata
Pleione formosana: Taiwan pleione (SE. China, N. & C. Taiwan).
Pleione forrestii (China – NW. Yunnan to N. Burma).
Pleione grandiflora (China – S. Yunnan to NW. Vietnam).
Pleione hookeriana (Nepal to China – SE. Yunnan to N. Guangdong to Indo-China).
Pleione humilis (C. Himalaya to Burma).
Pleione kaatiae
Pleione limprichtii: hardy Chinese orchid (China – C. Sichuan).
Pleione maculata (C. Himalaya to China – W. Yunnan).
Pleione microphylla (China – Guangdong).
Pleione pleionoides (C. China).
Pleione praecox (WC. Himalaya to China – S. Yunnan), type species.
Pleione saxicola (E. Bhutan to China – NW. Yunnan).
Pleione scopulorum (India – NE. Arunachal Pradesh to China – NW. Yunnan).
Pleione vietnamensis (SC. Vietnam).
Pleione yunnanensis (SC. China to N. Burma).

Natural hybrids 
Pleione × christianii (P. yunnanensis × P. forrestii) (China – W. Yunnan).
Pleione × confusa (P. albiflora × P. forrestii) (China – W. Yunnan).
Pleione × kohlsii (P. aurita × P. forrestii) (China – W. Yunnan).
Pleione × lagenaria (P. maculata × P. praecox) (Assam to China – W. Yunnan).
Pleione × taliensis (P. bulbocodioides × P. yunnanensis) (China – W. Yunnan).

Taxonomy 
It has been suggested that P. bulbocodioides, P. limprichtii and P. pleionoides could all be the same species.

Currently, there are two sections in the genus Pleione:
 section Pleione (includes the autumn-flowered species): P. × lagenaria, P. maculata, P. praecox, P. saxicola
 section Humiles (includes the spring-flowering species): P. albiflora, P. bulbocodioides, P. chunii, P. × confusa, P. coronaria, P. formosana, P. forrestii, P. grandiflora, P. hookeriana, P. praecox, P. × kohlsii, P. limprichtii, P. pleionoides, P. scopulorum, P. yunnanensis

Cultivation 
They are easily grown by the layman, easy to propagate and are among the most popular orchids. They are much in demand for hybridization. Numerous garden hybrids have been produced, of which the following have gained the Royal Horticultural Society's Award of Garden Merit:-  
Pleione Shantung grex 'Muriel Harberd'

Nothogenera 
Hybrids of Pleione with other genera are placed in the following nothogenera:
 Pleionilla (Plnl.) = Pleione × Bletilla
 Coeleione (Coeln.) = Pleione × Coelogyne

References

Notes 
 Phillip Cribb & Ian Butterfield : The Genus Pleione (Second Edition 1999) Natural History Publications in association with the Royal Botanic Gardens, Kew. 
 C. Z. Tang & I. Butterfield. 1983. The genus Pleione. Curtis’s Bot. Mag. 184: 93—147.

External links 

Arethuseae genera